The Liberal League; Japanese Jiyu Rengo (自由連合); was a liberal party in Japan. It was a minor party which held one seat in the House of Representatives in the Diet at its peak. The League, whose name can also be translated as "Freedom League" or "Libertarian Union" (even though its official English translation is Liberal League), had a liberal and free market political agenda.

The party was formed in 1994 and won a few seats in its first election; however, in the 2003 parliamentary elections, it won only one. It won no seats in the July 2004 Upper House Elections.

On domestic policy, the party supported privatization and smaller government, but also called for increasing the rights of women. It supported the government on most issues, and, despite being critical of Japan's close relationship with the United States, was supportive of the war in Iraq. It gained its base mostly from farmers. It supported the government (made up of the Liberal Democratic Party and New Kōmeitō) on most issues unofficially.

On domestic policy, the party was a liberal party.

In the 2005 lower house elections, the Liberal League's only sitting member of parliament declined to run for reelection. The party disbanded shortly afterwards.

See also
 Liberalism
 Contributions to liberal theory
 Liberalism worldwide
 List of liberal parties
 Liberal democracy
 List of political parties in Japan
 Politics of Japan
 Japanese Wikipedia article

References

External links
 Liberal League official site (includes an English section)

Liberal parties in Japan
Defunct liberal political parties
Classical liberal parties
Libertarian parties in Japan
Defunct political parties in Japan
Political parties established in 2001
Political parties disestablished in 2005
Libertarianism in Asia
2001 establishments in Japan